Time 'n' Place is the second studio album by British indie pop band Kero Kero Bonito, released on 1 October 2018 through Polyvinyl Record Co in North America and self-released worldwide. It is their first album released under Polyvinyl. Produced by the band's multi-instrumentalist Gus Lobban, it includes the previously released singles "Only Acting" (which was also featured on their TOTEP), "Time Today", and "Make Believe". Musically, the album marks a stylistic departure from the band's previous electronic musical efforts, showcasing a mix of indie rock, noise, shoegaze, dream pop, experimental pop, and synth-pop musical styles.

Background
The album represents a departure from the band's sound showcased in their debut album, Bonito Generation. During the tour of the album, the band played in Jakarta, Indonesia, where, in producer and drummer Gus Lobban's words, "the band experienced things we didn't even appreciate existed." After the tour, the band returned to their homes in the suburbs of London, and when the band regrouped they decided to "do whatever the fuck we want." Moreover, after Lobban heard the album Beyond the Fleeting Gales by the indie rock band Crying, he was inspired to start creating music with drums and guitars again, as he felt that album seamlessly combined Kero Kero Bonito's various influences with modern indie rock. Jamie Bulled and Lobban began to play on the instruments they first learned music on (bass guitar and drums, respectively), and Sarah Perry was moved to write lyrics inspired by images recalling her childhood memories following her discovery that her childhood home in Japan had been demolished. Thematically, the album touches on the loss of loved ones, physical objects and environments and loss of innocence. The song "Visiting Hours" features lyrics written by Lobban about his frequent visits to his hospitalised father, and "If I'd Known", written by Lobban and Bulled, was inspired by their frequent indecision. Lobban described the album as being inspired by the suburbs, as well as the physical rather than the virtual. Stylistically, as opposed to the rise of trap music in suburban London, the album's sound is influenced by suburban guitar bands, such as My Bloody Valentine, CSS, Lush and Sweet Trip.

Critical reception

Tshepo Mokoena of Noisey lauded Time 'n' Place, writing, "Somehow, Kero Kero Bonito have managed to squash so many textures of suburbia—inertia, comfort, a content sleepiness, something you want to resist because it's boring as hell—into a new album." She additionally stated that the album "feels like a rebirth" and "like an album about coming into your own as a person, without strictly being an album about adolescence."

Luke Pearson of Exclaim! awarded the album a score of 8 out of 10, writing that "there is nothing on Time 'n' Place that even remotely approaches the mainline sugar-rush of tracks like 'Trampoline' or 'Picture This' [from Bonito Generation] and frankly it's hard not to miss that style," but later stating that "won over you'll be, as long as you keep an open mind, as this is still a KKB album, full of great melodies, kitschy one-off synth flourishes, and amusing lyrical tangents." He concluded by calling it the band's most cohesive album, "with a real ebb and flow, as opposed to 2016's Bonito Generation, which, excellent as it was, sounded more like a collection of singles or SoundCloud posts."

Track listing 
All songs written by Gus Lobban except where noted.

Personnel
Credits adapted from Kero Kero Bonito's and their label's official websites.

Kero Kero Bonito
 Sarah Midori Perry – vocals
 Gus Lobban – drums, keyboards, backing vocals , production
 Jamie Bulled – bass, vocals 

Additional musicians
 James Rowland – guitar, noise
 The Parakeets (Cecile Believe, Elaiza Santos & Oscar) – backing vocals
 Jennifer Walton – noise 
 The Sometimes Singers (George, Yasmin, bo en, Aggie & Oscar) – extra vocals 
 Calum "Bo-En" Bowen – string arrangement 
 Cindy Foster & Greta Mutlu – violins 
 Alex Plant-Smith – cello 

Technical
 Jimmy Robertson – band recording
 Andy Ramsay – engineering, additional recording
 Anthony Lim – mixing, mastering

Charts

Release history

References

2018 albums
Kero Kero Bonito albums
Polyvinyl Record Co. albums